The Congressional International Exchange and Study Caucus is a caucus of the United States Congress that aims to raise awareness of the importance and benefits of international exchange and study abroad programs, which enable international citizens to have meaningful exchange experiences in the United States, and Americans to have such beneficial experiences in other countries.  It's co-chaired in the 114th Congress by Representatives Steve Pearce of New Mexico and Jim Himes of Connecticut.

Background 
International exchange and study programs are a proven and cost-effective way for the United States to remain internationally competitive, develop leaders, and promote American values. These programs support global engagement that is critical to our economy and national security.

Professional, academic, and cultural exchange programs reach a diverse set of participants of all ages, in the United States and nearly 200 countries around the world. Exchanges dramatically increase America's global reach and build durable connections based on mutual understanding and respect. These programs serve a valuable and effective diplomatic function, encouraging goodwill towards the U.S., and are a singularly effective way for American students and professionals to develop the foreign language skills and cultural awareness that U.S. employers need in order to remain globally competitive. 

In addition to enhancing America's competitiveness, international exchange and study programs provide significant immediate benefits to our nation's economy. Most of the U.S. Department of State's exchange program budget is spent either on Americans, American businesses and organizations, or in the United States. Exchange participants do business with U.S. small businesses, airlines, hotels, and non-governmental organizations in local communities and their presence in our colleges and universities supports U.S. academic institutions and enriches the experience of American students.

International Exchange Programs 
The U.S. Department of State funds an exceptional range of international exchange programs, such as the Fulbright Program, Kennedy-Lugar Youth Exchange and Study (YES) Program, Congress Bundestag Youth Exchange (CBYX) Program, Critical Language Scholarship (CLS) Program, American Council of Young Political Leaders (ACYPL), SportsUnited, and virtual exchange programs via digital platforms that bring international engagement to classrooms and to communities where travel options may be limited. These programs create vital opportunities for our young people, helping them not only to develop the critical skills they need to succeed in a global marketplace but also to serve as ambassadors of American youth around the world.

Other federally funded programs, including the International Visitor Leadership Program (IVLP) and the Young African Leaders Initiative (YALI), bring talented leaders from a variety of fields to the U.S. to expand their professional skills and networks. State Department evaluations repeatedly show that these and other participants who visit the United States through exchange programs leave with a better impression of our country, the American people, and our values. U.S. ambassadors consistently rank exchange programs among the most useful catalysts for long-term political change and mutual understanding.

J-1 Exchange Visitor Program (EVP) 
The U.S. Department of State's J-1 Exchange Visitor Program (EVP) annually engages nearly 300,000 future leaders from around the world and advances key U.S. foreign policy priorities – at virtually no cost to the American taxpayer. All of these exchange programs are privately funded and allow the U.S. to engage a wide variety of international participants at different points in their studies and careers, exposing them to the U.S., the American people, and American values and customs. These programs reach high priority audiences across the globe, including in countries key to U.S. foreign policy and national security interests: 86% of J-1 participants are under the age of 30, 46% are age 21 or under, and 53% of participants are female. 71,000 J-1 participants studied at U.S. high schools and universities across all 50 states just last year. More than 90% of all of J-1 participants have reported a more positive opinion of the U.S. and Americans following their programs, according to J-1 sponsor surveys.

J-1 exchange programs include a wide variety of participant categories, including: Au Pair, Camp Counselor, College and University Student, Intern, Professor and Research Scholar, Secondary School Student, Short-Term Scholar, Summer Work Travel, Teacher, and Trainee.

The U.S. Department of Education, U.S. Department of Defense, and almost all government agencies support programs encouraging the creation of international connections and expertise.

Members of the caucus during the 114th Congress

Caucus Activities 
The Caucus will provide a vital function for members of Congress and their constituents by serving as a clearinghouse of information for members who would like to notify constituents of exchange opportunities and engage with international exchange participants in their districts. The Caucus may also sponsor occasional events to inform members and staff about the purpose and efficacy of various exchange programs. Additionally, Caucus members can be a voice for international exchanges and the important diplomatic function our citizens serve in spreading American values and culture through their involvement as both overseas participants and hosts of international citizens in the U.S.

History 
The efforts to establish the Caucus were led by AFS-USA (formerly the American Field Service) and the Alliance for International Educational and Cultural Exchange.

External links 
 AFS-US
 Alliance for International Educational and Cultural Exchange
 Full list of U.S. Department of State-funded exchange programs
 International Visitor Leadership Program (IVLP)
 U.S. Department of State, Bureau of Educational and Cultural Affairs
 U.S. Department of State J-1 Exchange Visitor Program

Caucuses of the United States Congress